Ectoedemia virgulae is a moth of the family Nepticulidae. It was described by Annette Frances Braun in 1927. It is known from the United States including Ohio, Maryland and Florida, and in Canada from Ontario and Quebec.

The larvae feed on Corylus americana.

References

Nepticulidae
Moths of North America

Taxa named by Annette Frances Braun
Insects described in 1927